{{Infobox company
| name = Zip Co Limited
| logo = Zip Logo.svg
| type = Public limited company
| traded_as = 
| industry = Fintech, consumer finance, e-commerce
| former_name = ZipMoney Limited| foundation = 2013
| location = Sydney and New York City
| area_served = Australia, New Zealand, United States
| key_people = 
| products = Zip Pay, Zip Money, Zip Business Capital
| operating_income = 
| net_income = 
| num_employees = 
| ratio = 
| homepage = 
}}Zip Co Limited (abbreviated as Zip Co''') is a global 'buy now pay later' financial technology company with operations in Australia, New Zealand and the USA. According to their FY22 financial scorecard, across the group they had 12 million total customer account, a transaction volume of $8.7 billion AUD, revenue of $620 million AUD, and cash gross profit of $203.7 million. As of 21 December 2022, the market capitalization of Zip was $431 million AUD.

History
The company was founded by Larry Diamond and Peter Gray in 2013 as Zip Money, and offered a digital credit option to customers. The organisation soon launched a second product, Zip Pay, to cater for everyday purchases, including retail and health. 
In 2015, Zip was listed on the Australian Securities Exchange as zipMoney Limited (ASX: ZML).
In 2016, Zip acquired Pocketbook, one of the most popular finance apps in Australia. 
In 2017, Zip secured a $260 million debt facility with $200 million in funding from National Australia Bank, and a $40 million equity investment from Westpac Bank. Zip was also ranked #7 on Deloitte’s Technology Fast 500 APAC. In December 2017, the company changed its name from ‘ZipMoney Limited’ to ‘Zip Co Limited’, Zip Pay now known simply as Zip and in January 2018, the ASX ticker code was changed from ‘ZML’ to ‘Z1P’.

In August 2018, the Zip app was launched in the Google Play Store and then the Apple App Store later that year.

In August 2019, Zip Co acquired 100% of the shares in PartPay Limited, a Buy Now, Pay Later company from New Zealand with early operations in the UK. The acquisition accelerated Zip’s global expansion.

In September 2019, Zip Co acquired SpotCap ANZ to enter the unsecured business lending market.

In December 2019, Zip Co announced that it has received firm commitments to raise $60 million before costs via a placement of 16,216,216 ordinary shares to fund its global expansion.

In June 2020, Zip Co bought the remaining shares in New York-based "buy now, pay later" company Quadpay Inc for $430 million as part of its efforts to expand globally. 14% interest in Quadpay was already owned by Zip which it bought as part of its deal with New Zealand-based PartPay for $84 million in August 2019.

As of March 2021, Zip operates in the United States, the United Kingdom, Australia and New Zealand. They are also minority shareholders in Payflex in South Africa and Twisto in the Czech Republic.

In October 2021, Zip Co acquired Middle Eastern buy now pay later platform Spotii.

In November 2021, Zip Co acquired European buy now pay later platform Twisto.

In July 2022, Zip Co ceased operations in Singapore.

In October 2022, Zip Co began a wind down from the United Kingdom and ceased operations.

Products
The Zip digital wallet has two types of interest free accounts, Zip Pay and Zip Money. These accounts can be used with retail partners online and instore anywhere Zip is accepted.

Zip Pay / Zip Pay in 4
Zip Pay is a digital wallet that allows customers to purchase immediately and pay later, both in-store and online.

It provides an interest-free service until the end of each month leaving a $7.95 fee if the amount isn't paid by the due date. Accounts are available from $250 up to $1,500.

At the beginning of each month, customers are sent a summary (called a "statement") of what they have spent and what they have paid for the month. They are then given the opportunity to pay it off in full or pay it off for a minimum of $40 a month. Those with a $1500 account have to pay a minimum of $80 a month.

Zip Money 
Zip Money is also a digital wallet allowing customers to purchase immediately and pay later, both in store and online. It provides 6 months interest free service, providing a reusable amount of up to $30,000.

Zip Business Capital 
Zip Business Capital is an unsecured lending product offering up to $500,000 to small and medium businesses.

Discontinued products
As Zip has evolved as a business it has periodically retired products from its offering.

Pocketbook 
Zip was the owner and developer of freeware app Pocketbook, which was one of Australia’s largest non-bank financial  apps. Pocketbook was a freeware budget planner and personal finance app launched in 2012 and acquired by Zip in 2016. Users could set up and manage budgets, track spending and manage bills with the app. Pocketbook was the first personal finance app in Australia to offer users the ability to manage their money through linking their bank accounts. In 2016, Pocketbook claimed to support over 250,000 Australians. In January 2018, that number was 435,000. Zip announced the closure of Pocketbook in July 2022 and the app closed the following month.

Zip Business Trade and Trade Plus 
Zip Business Trade and Zip Business Trade Plus were accounts specifically aimed at small and medium businesses. They offered similar features to Zip Pay and Zip Money, with interest free periods and higher credit limits. As of 5 July 2022 these products were no longer offered to new customers, and as of 31 August 2022, existing accounts could no transact with these accounts. Customers were advised to switch to Zip Pay and Zip Money accounts instead.

References

External links
 

Companies listed on the Australian Securities Exchange
Financial services companies based in Sydney
Financial services companies established in 2013
Australian brands